The  is a fictional artifact and icon of Nintendo's The Legend of Zelda series of video games. It first appeared in the original 1986 action-adventure game The Legend of Zelda and is a focus of subsequent games in the series, including The Adventure of Link, A Link to the Past, Ocarina of Time, Oracle of Ages, Oracle of Seasons, The Wind Waker, Skyward Sword, and A Link Between Worlds. The Triforce consists of three equilateral triangles, which are joined to form a large equilateral triangle. In the lore of the series, it represents the essence of the Golden Goddesses who create the realm of Hyrule and is able to grant godlike power to the character who holds all three pieces. The Triforce also represents the three main characters of the series, Ganon, Zelda and Link, and their inherent qualities in the battle between good and evil. Due to its prominence and significance within the mythology of the Zelda series, the Triforce has received positive comments for being a widely recognisable symbol in gaming.

Background 
Although the Triforce has become associated with The Legend of Zelda series, an identical symbol originated nearly 1000 years before in medieval Japan. The symbol takes historical reference from the Hōjō clan, a family that took control of Japan in the 13th Century. Its emblem (mon) was the mitsuuroko, or "three scales". Other prominent families' mon were based on this symbol in later years. In the 1800s, it was used as a publisher's seal and continues to be a prominent feature in Japanese graphic design. It has also been used in various company logos.

Keiji Terui, who wrote the backstory in the manual of the original The Legend of Zelda, stated that the legend of the Triforce was written with inspirations from the battles of medieval Europe and initially given the working title "Death Mountain". The Triforce has become a recognisable icon of The Legend of Zelda series since the release of the original game in 1986. It has appeared in every game in the series in some form, particularly as part of the heraldry of the Kingdom of Hyrule.

Characteristics 

The Triforce consists of three equilateral triangles that are joined together to create a large equilateral triangle. In the lore of the series, each of the three golden triangle pieces that make up the Triforce are individually referred to as a Triforce and consist of the Triforce of Power, the Triforce of Wisdom, and the Triforce of Courage. These three parts represent the qualities of the Golden Goddesses who create the land of Hyrule, named Din, the Goddess of Power, Nayru, the Goddess of Wisdom and Farore, the Goddess of Courage. In the backstory, they create the Triforce and entrust it to the Goddess Hylia. These three qualities are distributed amongst the three main characters in the series respectively, Ganon, Princess Zelda and Link. When the three pieces of the Triforce are combined, they create a divine artefact that has the power to grant any wish. For this reason, the combined Triforce has been the main source of struggle for control within the series, due to its limitless power.

Within the Zelda game series, the Triforce has played a central role in the narrative. The three portions of the Triforce not only represent the three main characters, but are also used as moral symbols within the game. The trinity within the Triforce creates balance in the fictional kingdom of Hyrule, with evil seeking power, and wisdom and courage being the opposing forces for good. The Triforce has also been a fundamental mechanic of gameplay, having typically been the main objective within the Zelda games. It has been the driving force that motivates the player by its absence and is the incentive for the player to tackle the many tasks to complete each adventure.

The Triforce of Power is positioned at the top of the Triforce and is defined as the most powerful of the three Triforce components. It is typically associated with the series' villains, particularly Ganon or Ganondorf. In the lore of the series, it bestows "True Power" upon its wielder and has special abilities, such as the prevention of death. In various Zelda titles, such as The Legend of Zelda: Twilight Princess, it is shown that the Triforce of Power can keep Ganon alive when he is in possession of it and can even bring him back to life, giving him immortality. The Triforce of Power also gives Ganondorf physical strength and the political power to take over Hyrule in The Legend of Zelda: Ocarina of Time.

The Triforce of Wisdom is positioned on the left alongside the Triforce of Courage in the lower half of the Triforce and is associated with Princess Zelda, representing her intelligence and wisdom. She usually holds the Triforce of Wisdom in her possession in most Zelda titles and is responsible for preventing Ganon from claiming it. In the original The Legend of Zelda game it is the main focus of the storyline, as Link must defeat Ganon by tracking down its pieces. The Triforce of Wisdom is the source of Zelda's power and gives her the ability to conjure light arrows, which she uses against Ganondorf in The Legend of Zelda: The Wind Waker and Twilight Princess.

The Triforce of Courage is positioned on the right next to the Triforce of Wisdom and is associated with Link. He acquires it in Zelda II: The Adventure of Link from the Great Palace to save Zelda after she is placed in a magical sleep. It is unknown what abilities the Triforce of Courage bestows on Link, as he is not always in possession of it, however it is most closely associated with combat, strength and endurance. 

According to the storyline of The Legend of Zelda series, the three Triforce parts can be split into several pieces. In the original The Legend of Zelda video game, the Triforce of Wisdom is divided into eight pieces, which are scattered across the land by Princess Zelda. In The Legend of Zelda: The Wind Waker, the Triforce of Courage is split into eight irregularly shaped shards and the Triforce of Wisdom into two. 

In some Zelda games, the Triforce manifests itself as a symbol on the hand of its bearer. In The Legend of Zelda: Breath of the Wild, Zelda fights against Calamity Ganon by unlocking her powers and displays the Triforce symbol on the back of her hand.

The Triforce has also been shown to have limited sentience and the ability to communicate, despite typically being an inanimate object. In The Legend of Zelda: A Link to the Past and The Legend of Zelda: Oracle of Seasons and Oracle of Ages, it communicates with Link as the "essence of the Triforce".

In 2016, Zelda series producer Eiji Aonuma referred to the Triforce in an interview to justify the reason for not creating a female Link character: "You know there's the idea of the Triforce in the Zelda games we make... The Triforce is made up of Princess Zelda, Ganon and Link. Princess Zelda is obviously female. If we made Link a female we thought that would mess with the balance of the Triforce. That's why we decided not to do it".

Appearances

The Legend of Zelda series

The Triforce is a common symbol found in various Zelda titles. In the lore of the series, it is connected with the Royal Family of Hyrule and is displayed as part of the Hyrule Royal Family's signature crest, which combines the Triforce with a fictional bird called a Crimson Loftwing. It is also found on various objects within the games such as the Ocarina of Time, the Master Sword and the Hylian Shield. The Triforce also appears on Hyrulean temples and other sacred sites within the games, such as the Temple of Time.

The Triforce was first introduced in 1986 with the release of the original The Legend of Zelda video game. In the game only the Triforce of Power and Triforce of Wisdom exist in the story. The storyline is set out in The Legend of Zelda Instruction Booklet, which describes the Triforce as "golden triangles possessing mystical powers" and explains that the main antagonist Ganon has attacked the Kingdom of Hyrule and stolen the Triforce of Power. After Princess Zelda splits the Triforce of Wisdom into eight pieces and hides them across the land, Link is sent by her nursemaid, Impa to search for the pieces and reassemble them to destroy Ganon.

In Zelda II: The Adventure of Link (1987) the Triforce is again the main objective of gameplay. The sequel to the original game introduces the Triforce of Courage as the third piece of the three-triangle imagery that has been used in all game depictions ever since. The storyline is set out in The Adventure of Link Instruction Booklet, which begins with Link discovering a strange mark on his hand as he approaches his 16th birthday. When he discovers that Zelda has been placed in a magical sleep, Impa tells him about the legend of Zelda and gives him a scroll that reveals the secrets of the Triforce. The scroll states, "There are three kinds of Triforce - Power, Wisdom and Courage. When these three are brought together, the Triforce will show its maximum power" and "If it is misused, it will produce many evils". Link is sent by Impa to save the princess by retrieving the hidden Triforce of Courage and reuniting the pieces of the Triforce to "bring back peace to Hyrule".

The Legend of Zelda: A Link to the Past (1991) introduces a detailed lore for the Triforce. In the game's instruction booklet, the lore is laid out in the introduction titled "The Legends of Hyrule". The booklet relates the "Triforce myth" recorded in Hylian scrolls. It explains that the mythical gods (the God of Power, the God of Wisdom and the God of Courage) descended to create life. Before they left the world, they created "a symbol of their strength, a golden triangle known as the Triforce" which is the "essence of the gods". It explains that the Triforce has the power to bestow three titles on its bearers - "The Forger of Strength", The Keeper of Knowledge" and "The Juror of Courage". In the lore, the gods hid the Triforce in the Golden Land and its location is lost in time, but many seek it due to its power to make "mortal dreams come true". The storyline further explains that this lust for power is the cause of war and bloodshed. The gate to the Golden Land is opened by a gang of thieves led by Ganondorf who uses its power for evil to attack the castle of Hyrule. He is eventually sealed in the Golden Land by Seven Wise Men. With the impending threat of Ganon's return, Link is tasked with entering the Golden Land (now known as the Dark World) to defeat Ganon and restore peace to Hyrule.

In The Legend of Zelda: Ocarina of Time (1998), Ganondorf's primary goal is to obtain the Triforce in order to take control of Hyrule. Although he reaches the Triforce in the Sacred Realm, his heart is imbalanced, which causes the Triforce to split into its three components, leaving Ganondorf with the Triforce of Power. The remaining pieces are sealed in "those chosen by destiny" - the Triforce of Courage in Link and the Triforce of Wisdom in Zelda. Each of the three characters receive the mark of the Triforce on the back of one hand. Although Ganon suffers defeat at the hands of Link and is banished to the Sacred Realm by the power of the Seven Sages, he retains the Triforce of Power, while Link and Zelda retain their Triforce pieces.

In The Legend of Zelda: The Wind Waker (2002), the Triforce again makes a prominent appearance in the game. Link must collect all the pieces of the Triforce of Courage before he is ready to face Ganondorf. At the end of the game, Ganondorf successfully unites the pieces into the completed Triforce at the top of Ganon's tower. However, before he can touch it and make his wish to rule Hyrule, the King of Hyrule's spirit touches it and wishes for Hyrule to be completely destroyed. The game ends in a final battle between Ganondorf, Link and Zelda.

The Triforce plays a lesser role in The Legend of Zelda: Twilight Princess (2006). At the beginning of the game, each of the three main characters is shown to be in possession of their individual component by the glowing triangles that appear on their hands.

The Legend of Zelda: Skyward Sword (2011) again focuses on the creation of the Triforce by the Three Goddesses, who leave it behind upon departing for the heavens. In the storyline demonic creatures rise from cracks in the earth led by Demonic King Demise with the intention of claiming the Triforce. However, to protect the Triforce from evil, the goddess Hylia commands an army of the world's people to fight Demise. She seals him away and after becoming mortal, sends the humans to live in the clouds above the surface world in Skyloft. She also hides the Triforce in the sky to await the hero, Link who is capable of using its powers for good to defeat Demise.

In The Legend of Zelda: A Link Between Worlds (2013), the Triforce makes a prominent appearance in the storyline. In the game, Link pursues the main villain, a wizard named Yuga, who turns his victims into paintings. When Link arrives in Lorule, he meets Princess Hilda, who appears to help him. The story reveals that the Lorulean desire for the Triforce nearly destroyed Lorule, so they attempted to destroy it. However, instead of trying to rebuild their crumbling kingdom, Hilda and Yuga plan to steal the Triforce from Hyrule and resurrect Ganon.

Despite its prominence in the Zelda series, the Triforce plays no part in the storyline of The Legend of Zelda: Breath of the Wild (2017). As the game's main antagonist is Calamity Ganon, a more primal version of Ganon, the storyline has no need for the divine artifact in the game's plot. Breath of the Wild takes place thousands of years after the previous Zelda titles, so the Triforce is no longer shown to be a prominent concept for the people of Hyrule. However, the symbol appears in various places within the game and manifests itself on the hand of Zelda in the battle against the Calamity.

Spin-off games 
In the series spin-off hack and slash video game Hyrule Warriors (2014), the Triforce is the objective for one of the main antagonists, Cia. Her role begins as a guardian of the Triforce, until she is corrupted by Ganon after displaying affections for Link. She builds a huge army to try to obtain the Triforce. Her character splits into two, with Lana being the good side and Cia being the dark side. At the end of the game she is defeated with the understanding that her affections for Link are not returned.

Television series
In The Legend of Zelda animated series the Triforce is introduced within the introduction and consists of two pieces. While Ganon has the Triforce of Power in his possession, Zelda possesses the Triforce of Wisdom. The Triforce of Courage does not feature in the series. The basic plot of each episode revolves around Ganon's attempts to gain control of both Triforce pieces so that he can become the ruler of Hyrule.

In the animated television series Captain N: The Game Master, the Triforce appears in the episode titled Having a Ball. The episode begins in the kingdom of Hyrule after the defeat of Ganon. The storyline centres on Eggplant Wizard and King Hippo attempting to steal the pieces of the Triforce while Zelda and Link are attending Lana's royal ball.

Other media
The Triforce has appeared in various other video games. It appeared in Super Smash Bros. Brawl, Super Smash Bros. for Nintendo 3DS and Wii U and Super Smash Bros. Ultimate. The "Triforce Slash" appears on Toon Link's, Link’s and Young Link's "Final Smash" attack, as he emits a beam of light from the Triforce of Courage on his left hand in order to trap the enemy between two Triforce-shaped force fields before relentlessly slashing them. In Animal Crossing: Wild World and Animal Crossing: New Leaf, the Triforce has appeared as a furniture item. In Kirby Super Star, The Great Cave Offensive requires Kirby to collect treasures while escaping from a vast cave. The final treasure is the distinctively Zelda-like Triforce. In the 3DS StreetPass Mii Plaza, the Triforce appears as one of the unlockable outfits for the player's Mii appearing on top of the Mii's head when worn. In Nintendo Land, there is a mini-game based on The Legend of Zelda in which the player's Mii can play in the role of Link through various stages. The goal of the mini-game is to defeat enemies and reach the Triforce at the end of each stage. In Sonic Lost Worlds The Legend of Zelda DLC stage, the Triforce appears at the end when Sonic the Hedgehog clears the level. In Mario Kart 8s The Legend of Zelda × Mario Kart 8 expansion pack and its enhanced Nintendo Switch port, one of the grand prix cups is known as the "Triforce Cup". It also appears on some vehicle parts that are bundled with the expansion pack.

"Triforce" is also a name given to an arcade board system that was a joint venture from three companies; Namco, Nintendo and Sega using a combination of Nintendo GameCube and Sega GD-ROM hardware inside a Namco cabinet.

In popular culture

The three-triangle shape is also found outside The Legend of Zelda series (and predates the game series in all cases). The Austrian ski maker Fischer Sports, the power equipment corporation Delta Machinery, British Army division 3rd Division and the Japanese Energy company Mitsuuroko (三つ鱗, three scales) use it in their logo, as did the Later Hōjō clan for its emblem (mon).

The design of the Triforce in the Zelda series came from the Hōjō clan, and the incorporation of the symbol was similar to how Western games used crossed swords. Another theory holds that the Triforce was based on Gunpei Yokoi's family crest. Other theories include the Triforce drawing inspiration from the Divine Trinity, with the early Zelda games incorporating Christianity with depictions of crosses, bibles, and art of a crucifix.

The Triforce has been used as a shibboleth and a meme to embarrass newer users of the imageboard website 4chan. Experienced users write it using Unicode characters, but copying and pasting the Triforce results in the symbol becoming misaligned.

Reception 
Since its introduction, the Triforce has become a recognisable icon of The Legend of Zelda series. It has been recreated in various works of fan art. Josh Tyler for Screen Rant commented on its legacy by stating that "the Triforce is perhaps The Legend of Zelda's most iconic weapon". Luke Plunkett of Kotaku opined: "It's one of the most iconic designs in the history of video games: three golden triangles combined to form a single larger one. The Triforce. The object that lies at the heart of The Legend of Zelda". Renan Fontes for TheGamer commented that "the Triforce's presence has only grown (even when it's absent for entire titles). It's far and away the most important image to come out of The Legend of Zelda". Cian Maher for TheGamer opined that the Triforce is "the most ubiquitous, beloved, and globally recognizable theme, symbol, and concept of The Legend of Zelda". 

The Triforce has also been the subject of interpretation with regards to its significance within the Zelda series. Luke Cuddy considered that the three Triforce pieces are all neutral and equal, stating that "although we haven't seen it yet, in the hands of Link and Zelda, they could use the Triforce of Courage and Wisdom just as negatively as Ganondorf used the Triforce of Power" but "they act from a sense of duty and are following their good will". Anthony Bean opined that the Triforce is a symbol of the self in Jungian psychology, because it "serves as a connection between Hyrule (the conscious, mortal realm) and the goddesses (the unconscious, divine realm) just as the self serves as a meeting point for the ego and the unconscious". Edge staff described the Triforce as "gaming's most famous object", noting the significance of its use within the Zelda mythology.The triangle also contains all of the other trinities through which we filter the world. Human, beast and earth. White, black and gray. Yes, no and maybe. Birth, life and death. Maiden, mother and crone. Father, mother and child. Mind, body and soul. Three primary colours. Three chances. Three Fates. We can intuit all of this in the shape itself, unadorned with the game's fiction. And it's still a thrill to see Link raise it above his head in triumph – a glowing three-sided mystery, inscrutable yet brimming with meaning.

See also
 Sierpinski triangle

References

Magic items
The Legend of Zelda
Video game objects
Fictional elements introduced in 1986

ca:Triforce
simple:Triforce
sv:Trekraft